Huang Taizi Mishi is a 2004 Chinese television series produced by You Xiaogang. The series is the second instalment in a series of four television series about the history of the early Qing dynasty. It was preceded by Xiaozhuang Mishi (2003), and followed by Taizu Mishi (2005) and Secret History of Kangxi (2006), all of which were also produced by You Xiaogang.

Plot
The series retells the life of Yinreng, a son and heir apparent to the Kangxi Emperor. Yinreng was installed as the crown prince and demoted twice throughout his life. His younger brother, Yinzhen, eventually takes the throne and becomes the Yongzheng Emperor.

Cast
 Steve Ma as Yinreng
 Liu Dekai as the Kangxi Emperor
 Dai Jiaoqian as Ruyu
 Ning Jing as Princess Jianning
 Hu Jing as Ziying
 Wu Qianqian as Consort De
 Zhao Hongfei as Yinzhen
 Shu Chang as Princess Yun
 Lü Zhong as Empress Dowager Xiaozhuang
 Bai Qinglin as Shulun
 Huang Leixin as Yinsi
 Chen Zhihui as Yinti
 Gao Ming as Wang Zhiming
 Zheng Tianyong as Songgotu
 Xu Min as Mingju
 Cai Wen as Consort Hui
 Zheng Shuang as Princess Changping
 Qiao Qiao as young Princess Changping
 Shi Xiaoqun as Lady Niohuru
 Zong Fengyan as Longkodo
 Zhang Jianxiang as Heshen
 Zhou Jia as Empress Hešeri
 Wan Ni'en as Lady Gorolo

External links
  Huang Taizi Mishi on Sina.com
  Huang Taizi Mishi on ctv.com

2004 Chinese television series debuts
Television series set in the Qing dynasty
Mandarin-language television shows
Chinese historical television series